Harry Reeves may refer to:

Harry Gosford Reeves (1896–1918), British military aviator
Harry Wendell Reeves (1910–2001), American sports shooter
Harry Reeves (screenwriter), of Fun and Fancy Free and other Disney films
Harry Reeves (animator), of Egyptian Melodies and other Disney films

See also
Harry Reeve (1893–1958), British boxer
Henry Reeves (disambiguation)